Portrait of Richard Milles is a 1760s oil on canvas portrait painting by Pompeo Batoni, now in the National Gallery, London. Its subject is the English nobleman Richard Milles, who probably had it produced during a visit to Rome on his Grand Tour. He points to the Canton of Grisons in Switzerland on a map, with a bust of Marcus Aurelius in the background. Batoni also produced a miniature head of Milles, now in the Fitzwilliam Museum in Cambridge.

Description 
The subject of the portrait is most likely the English nobleman Richard Milles. The painting may have been done in Rome, the city where Batoni was active and where Mills stopped during his Grand Tour. The character indicates on a map the Swiss Grisons, where he stopped, while the bust of Marcus Aurelius testifies to his interest in classical culture. A miniature of the painting, made by Batoni himself, is kept in the Fitzwilliam museum in Cambridge.

References

1760s paintings
Milles, Richard
Collections of the National Gallery, London